Roderick John MacLeod, Lord Minginish,  (Gaelic: Ruairidh Iain MacLeòid; born ), also known as Roddy John, is a Scottish advocate. From 2014 until his retirement in December 2022, he was Chairman of the Scottish Land Court and President of the Lands Tribunal for Scotland.  He was the first Gaelic-speaking chair of the court.

Early life 

MacLeod was born on the Isle of Skye in about 1953. His parents, who were both from the outer-Hebridean isle of Harris, moved in the 1920s to Portnalong in Skye in the 1920s as part of a land settlement scheme.

He was educated on Skye at Portnalong Junior Secondary School from 1957 to 1965, and at Portree High School from 1965 to 1971. He then studied law at the University of Edinburgh, graduating with LLB honours in 1975.

Career 
MacLeod then undertook a two-year legal apprenticeship in Edinburgh, before working for from 1977–78 in Gaelic-language broadcasting at BBC Scotland, where he presented current affairs programmes on television. He then completed his training in Motherwell, qualifying as a solicitor in 1980. He practised as a solicitor in Edinburgh until 1993, and in July 1994 he was admitted to the  Faculty of Advocates.

In 2000, MacLeod was appointed as a Sheriff to Edinburgh Sheriff Court. In 2013 he "took silk", becoming a Queen's Counsel.

Land Court 
Sheriff MacLeod became Deputy Chair of the Scottish Land Court in 2006, serving under Lord McGhie. In 2013, he accompanied Lord McGhie and High Court Judge Lord Bracadale to Skye to commemorate the 130th anniversary of the 1882 Battle of the Braes.  The visit was to acknowledge that the court "stands on the shoulders" of the people of Braes who had resisted the attempt eviction of 12 crofters. Their rebellion spread, and led to the Napier Commission and then the Crofters Act 1886, which gave crofters security of tenure.

In September 2014, he was appointed by Elizabeth II to succeed McGhie as Chairman of the Land Court, having been nominated by First Minister Alex Salmond on the recommendation by the independent Judicial Appointments Board for Scotland. Since 1978, the Chair of the Land Court has also held the office of President of the separate Lands Tribunal for Scotland, and MacLeod also holds both roles.

He took office on 1 October 2014. On 17 October, MacLeod was installed in office at the Land Court's headquarters in George House, Edinburgh.  The ceremony was led by Lord Gill, who was then the Lord President of the Court of Session and head of the Scottish judiciary. MacLeod took the judicial title Lord Minginish, after the parish of Minginish in Skye, where he was raised.

He retired in December 2022

Other interests 
Since 2006, MacLeod has been director of Sabhal Mòr Ostaig, the National Centre for Gaelic Language and Culture, based on the Skye. He has been chair of the higher education college's board of directors since 2007.

In 2010, MacLeod was a keynote speaker at An t-Alltan, an annual conference organised by Stòrlann Nàiseanta na Gàidhlig for teachers working in Gaelic medium education.

He is also a member of the council of the Royal Celtic Society.

Personal life 
MacLeod married his wife Lorna in 1980.  He lives in Edinburgh.

Notes

References

External links 
 The Scottish Land Court

|-

1953 births
Year of birth uncertain
Living people
People from the Isle of Skye
People educated at Portree High School
Alumni of the University of Edinburgh
Minginish
Scottish solicitors
Members of the Faculty of Advocates
Scottish King's Counsel
21st-century King's Counsel
BBC Scotland newsreaders and journalists
Scottish sheriffs